Qez Qabri-ye Rashid (also Romanized as Qez Qabrī-ye Rashīd; also known as Qez Qabrī-ye Rashīd ‘Alī, Qez Qebrī-ye Do, and Qez Qebrī-ye Rashīd ‘Alī) is a village in Baladarband Rural District, in the Central District of Kermanshah County, Kermanshah Province, Iran. At the 2006 census, its population was 64, in 17 families.

References 

Populated places in Kermanshah County